is a multimedia project created by Kadokawa, Marvelous, and Egg Firm. An anime television series by TNK aired from October 2019 to January 2020. A racing game published by Marvelous and developed by its subsidiary Honey∞Parade Games was released in Japan for the PlayStation 4 in January 2020. A Western version of the game was released for the PlayStation 4 and Microsoft Windows in August 2020. The North American version was published by Xseed Games, while the European and Australian versions were published by Marvelous Europe.

Plot
Jet Racing is a popular sport where teams of two girls work together. They consist of a Jetter, who pilots the watercraft, and a Shooter, who fires a water gun at rival teams. Aspiring to be a Jetter just like her legendary mother, Rin Namiki decides to leave her home in the countryside in order to realize her dream. Arriving in Asakusa, she meets Misa Aoi and they form a partnership. With each race, their bond grows stronger.

Characters

Kandagawa Jet Girls

Dress

Hell's Kitchen

Unkai Surfers

MKHU

Suiryukai

Grindcore

Production and release

Anime
On July 26, 2019, Kadokawa, Marvelous, and Egg Firm announced a new multimedia project with Senran Kagura producer Kenichiro Takaki. Takaki revealed that the new multimedia project would include a planned game and anime television series. The series was animated by TNK and directed by Hiraku Kaneko, with Gō Zappa handling the series' composition, and Tsutomu Miyazawa designing the characters. Egg Firm produced the series. 

While the first episode had an advanced broadcast debut on AT-X on September 25, 2019, the series officially aired from October 8, 2019 to January 7, 2020 on AT-X, Tokyo MX, MBS, and BS11. Yū Sasahara and Riko Kohara performed the opening theme "Bullet Mermaid", while Azusa Tadokoro performed the ending theme "RIVALS." The series is licensed by Sentai Filmworks. An OVA episode is bundled with the limited edition of the game titled . 

On February 18, 2021, Sentai Filmworks announced that the series would receive an English dub.

Video game
A racing game published by Marvelous was released in Japan for the PlayStation 4 on January 16, 2020. The game features shooting elements and eight courses with different variations, as well as a story mode, a free mode, and a multiplayer mode. On May 21, 2020, Marvelous and Xseed Games announced that the game would be released in North America for the PlayStation 4 and Microsoft Windows in Summer 2020. On July 17, 2020, it was announced the game would be released in the West on August 25, 2020. On the same day, it was also announced that the PlayStation 4 version would receive a digital-only release in Europe and Australia.

Reception
Gadget Tsūshin listed "Mijoka", a phrase uttered by Rin, in their 2019 anime buzzwords list.

See also
Kyōtei

Notes

References

External links
Official anime website 
Official game website 
Official game website 

2019 anime television series debuts
2020 video games
Anime with original screenplays
AT-X (TV network) original programming
Censored television series
 Fictional sports in anime and manga
Kadokawa Dwango franchises
Marvelous Entertainment franchises
PlayStation 4 games
Racing video games
School life in anime and manga
Sentai Filmworks
Television shows set in Tokyo
TNK (company)
Video games developed in Japan
Video games set in Tokyo
Windows games